The Brandenburg Gate is an 18th-century neoclassical monument in Berlin, built on the orders of Prussian king Frederick William II after restoring the Orangist power by suppressing the Dutch popular unrest. One of the best-known landmarks of Germany, it was built on the site of a former city gate that marked the start of the road from Berlin to the town of Brandenburg an der Havel, which used to be the capital of the Margraviate of Brandenburg.

It is located in the western part of the city centre of Berlin within Mitte, at the junction of Unter den Linden and Ebertstraße, immediately west of the Pariser Platz. One block to the north stands the Reichstag building, which houses the German parliament (Bundestag). The gate is the monumental entry to Unter den Linden, a boulevard of linden trees which led directly to the royal City Palace of the Prussian monarchs.

Throughout its existence, the Brandenburg Gate was often a site for major historical events and is today considered not only as a symbol of the tumultuous histories of Germany and Europe, but also of European unity and peace.

History

Design and construction 

In the time of Frederick William (1688), shortly after the Thirty Years' War and a century before the gate was constructed, Berlin was a small walled city within a star fort with several named gates: Spandauer Tor, St. Georgen Tor, Stralower Tor, Cöpenicker Tor, Neues Tor, and Leipziger Tor (see map).  Relative peace, a policy of religious tolerance, and status as capital of the Kingdom of Prussia facilitated the growth of the city.

The Brandenburg Gate was not part of the old Berlin Fortress, but one of eighteen gates within the Berlin Customs Wall, erected in the 1730s, including the old fortified city and many of its then suburbs.

The new gate was commissioned by Frederick William II of Prussia to represent peace and was originally named the Peace Gate (German: Friedenstor). It was designed by Carl Gotthard Langhans, the Court Superintendent of Buildings, and built between 1788 and 1791, replacing the earlier simple guardhouses which flanked the original gate in the Customs Wall. The gate consists of twelve Doric columns, six to each side, forming five passageways. Citizens were originally allowed to use only the outermost two on each side. Its design is based on the Propylaea, the gateway to the Acropolis in Athens, Greece, and is consistent with Berlin's history of architectural classicism (first, Baroque, and then neo-Palladian). The gate was the first element of a "new Athens on the River Spree" by architect Langhans. Atop the gate is a sculpture by Johann Gottfried Schadow of a quadriga – a chariot drawn by four horses – driven by Victoria, the Roman goddess of victory.

19th and early 20th centuries 
The Brandenburg Gate has played different political roles in German history. After the 1806 Prussian defeat at the Battle of Jena-Auerstedt, Napoleon was the first to use the Brandenburg Gate for a triumphal procession, and took its quadriga to Paris.

After Napoleon's defeat in 1814 and the Prussian occupation of Paris by General Ernst von Pfuel, the quadriga was restored to Berlin. It was now redesigned by Karl Friedrich Schinkel for the new role of the Brandenburg Gate as a Prussian triumphal arch. The goddess, now definitely Victoria, was equipped with the Prussian eagle and Iron Cross on her lance with a wreath of oak leaves.

The quadriga faces east, as it did when it was originally installed in 1793. Only the royal family was allowed to pass through the central archway, as well as members of the Pfuel family, from 1814 to 1919. The Kaiser granted this honour to the family in gratitude to Ernst von Pfuel, who had overseen the return of the quadriga to the top of the gate.  In addition, the central archway was also used by the coaches of ambassadors on the single occasion of their presenting their letters of credence to council.

When the Nazis ascended to power, they used the gate as a party symbol. The gate survived World War II and was one of the damaged structures still standing in the Pariser Platz ruins in 1945 (another being the Academy of Fine Arts). The gate was badly damaged with holes in the columns from bullets and nearby explosions.  One horse's head from the original quadriga survived, and is today kept in the collection of the Märkisches Museum. Efforts to disguise the government district of Berlin and confuse Allied bombers had included the construction of a replica Brandenburg Gate located away from the city centre.

Cold War 

After Germany's surrender at the end of the war, the governments of East Berlin and West Berlin restored it in a joint effort. The holes were patched, but were visible for many years. The gate was located in the Soviet occupation zone, directly next to the border to the British occupation zone, which later became the border between East and West Berlin.

Vehicles and pedestrians could travel freely through the gate until the day after construction began on the Berlin Wall on Barbed Wire Sunday, 13 August 1961. West Berliners gathered on the western side of the gate to demonstrate against the Berlin Wall, among them West Berlin's mayor, Willy Brandt, who had returned from a federal election campaign tour in West Germany earlier the same day. The wall passed directly by the western side of the gate, which was closed throughout the Berlin Wall period, which ended on 22 December 1989.

Post-1989 

When the Revolutions of 1989 occurred and the wall was demolished, the gate symbolized freedom and the desire to unify the city of Berlin. Thousands of people gathered at the wall to celebrate its fall on 9 November 1989. On 22 December 1989, the Brandenburg Gate border crossing was reopened when Helmut Kohl, the West German chancellor, walked through to be greeted by Hans Modrow, the East German prime minister. Demolition of the rest of the wall around the area took place the following year.

During 1990, the quadriga was removed from the gate as part of renovation work carried out by the East German authorities following the fall of the wall in November 1989. Germany was officially reunified in October 1990.

The Brandenburg Gate was privately refurbished on 21 December 2000, at a cost of six million euros. It was once again opened on 3 October 2002 following extensive refurbishment, for the 12th anniversary of German reunification.

The Brandenburg Gate became the main venue for the 20th-anniversary celebrations of the fall of the Berlin Wall or "Festival of Freedom" on the evening of 9 November 2009. The domino "wall" was then toppled in stages converging here.

The Brandenburg Gate is now again closed to vehicle traffic, and much of Pariser Platz has been turned into a cobblestone pedestrian zone. The gate, along with the broad Straße des 17. Juni avenue to the west, is also one of the large public areas in Berlin where over a million people can gather to watch stage shows or party together, watch major sport events shown on huge screens, or see fireworks at midnight on New Year's Eve. After winning the 2014 FIFA World Cup, the Germany national football team held their victory rally in front of the gate.

It has also hosted street events at 2009 IAAF World Championships in Athletics and repeated its role in 2018 European Athletics Championships. It is also the usual finish line of the Berlin Marathon.

Political history

A Soviet flag flew from a flagpole atop the gate from 1945 until 1957, when it was replaced by an East German flag. Since the reunification of Germany in 1990, the flag and the pole have been removed. During the 1953 riots in East Berlin the Soviet flag was torn off by West Germans.

In 1963, U.S. President John F. Kennedy visited the Brandenburg Gate. The Soviets hung large red banners across it to prevent him looking into East Berlin.

In the 1980s, decrying the existence of two German states and two Berlins, West Berlin mayor Richard von Weizsäcker said: "The German Question is open as long as the Brandenburg Gate is closed."

On 12 June 1987, U.S. President Ronald Reagan spoke to the West Berlin populace at the Brandenburg Gate, demanding the razing of the Berlin Wall.  Addressing the General Secretary of the Communist Party of the Soviet Union, Mikhail Gorbachev, Reagan said, 

On 25 December 1989, less than two months after the Berlin Wall began to come down, the conductor Leonard Bernstein conducted the Berlin Philharmonic in a version of the Ninth Symphony of Beethoven at the then newly opened Brandenburg Gate.  In the concluding choral movement of the symphony, the "Ode to Joy", the word Freude ("Joy") was replaced with Freiheit ("Freedom") to celebrate the fall of the Wall and the imminent reunification of Germany.

On 2–3 October 1990, the Brandenburg Gate was the scene of the official ceremony to mark the reunification of Germany.  At the stroke of midnight on 3 October, the black-red-gold flag of West Germany—now the flag of a reunified Germany—was raised over the gate.

On 12 July 1994, U.S. President Bill Clinton spoke at the Brandenburg Gate about peace in post–Cold War Europe formally declaring, "Berlin is free!"

On 9 November 2009, Chancellor Angela Merkel walked through the Brandenburg Gate with Russia's Mikhail Gorbachev and Poland's Lech Wałęsa as part of the 20-year anniversary of the fall of the Berlin Wall while former East German leader Egon Krenz, recently released from prison, looked on from the cheering crowd on the sidewalk. Gorbachev pointed, smiled and waved to Krenz who did not return the gesture. After Gorbachev had passed by and the crowd realized who Krenz was, they began to howl and throw rubbish at him.

On 13 August 2011, Germany marked the 50th anniversary of the day the Berlin Wall began construction with a memorial service and a minute of silence in memory of those who died trying to flee to the West.  "It is our shared responsibility to keep the memory alive and to pass it on to the coming generations as a reminder to stand up for freedom and democracy to ensure that such injustice may never happen again," Berlin Mayor Klaus Wowereit said.  German Chancellor Angela Merkel—who grew up behind the wall in Germany's communist eastern part—also attended the commemoration. German President Christian Wulff added, "It has been shown once again: Freedom is invincible at the end. No wall can permanently withstand the desire for freedom."

On 19 June 2013, U.S. President Barack Obama spoke at the Gate about nuclear arms reduction and the recently revealed U.S. internet surveillance activities.

On the night of 5 January 2015, the lights illuminating the gate were completely shut off in protest against a protest held by far-right anti-Islamic group Pegida.

In April 2017, Die Zeit noted that the gate was not illuminated in Russian colours after the 2017 Saint Petersburg Metro bombing. The gate was previously illuminated after attacks in Jerusalem and Orlando. The Berlin Senate only allows the gate to be illuminated for events in partner cities and cities with a special connection to Berlin.

In February 2022, the gate was lit up with the colors of the Ukrainian flag, during the 2022 Russian invasion of Ukraine. A candlelight vigil was also held in front of the gate on the 31st Independence Day of Ukraine.

Gallery

See also

 Mitte (locality)
 Puerta de Alcalá – a similar structure in Madrid
 Siegestor – a similar structure in Bavaria

References

External links

 Official website
 Events at Brandenburg Gate

Gates in Germany
Buildings and structures in Mitte
Monuments and memorials in Berlin
Landmarks in Germany
Triumphal arches in Germany
Berlin border crossings
Terminating vistas in Germany
Heritage sites in Berlin
Tourist attractions in Berlin
National symbols of Germany
Prussian cultural sites
Buildings and structures completed in 1791
1791 establishments in the Holy Roman Empire
Classicist architecture in Germany
Greek Revival architecture in Germany
Neoclassical architecture in Berlin
Articles containing video clips